The Brazilian monitor Ceará was the fifth ship of the  river monitors built for the Brazilian Navy during the Paraguayan War in the late 1860s. Ceará arrived in Paraguay in mid-1868 and provided fire support for the army for the rest of the war. The ship was assigned to the Mato Grosso Flotilla after the war. Ceará was scrapped in 1884.

Design and description
The Pará-class monitors were designed to meet the need of the Brazilian Navy for small, shallow-draft armoured ships capable of withstanding heavy fire. The monitor configuration was chosen as a turreted design did not have the same problems engaging enemy ships and fortifications as did the central battery ironclads already in Brazilian service. The oblong gun turret sat on a circular platform that had a central pivot. It was rotated by four men via a system of gears; 2.25 minutes were required for a full 360° rotation. A bronze ram was fitted to these ships as well. The hull was sheathed with Muntz metal to reduce biofouling.

With only  of freeboard they had to be towed between Rio de Janeiro and their area of operations. Their crew numbered 43 officers and men.

Propulsion
The Pará-class ships had two direct-acting steam engines, each driving a single  propeller. The ships carried enough coal for one day's steaming.

Armament
Ceará had a single 120-pounder Whitworth rifled muzzle loader (RML) in her gun turret. Most unusually the guns' Brazilian-designed iron carriage was designed to pivot vertically at the muzzle; this was done to minimize the size of the gunport through which splinters and shells could enter.

Armor
The hull of the Pará-class ships was made from three layers of wood that alternated in orientation.

The gun turret was shaped like a rectangle with rounded corners. Its roof and the exposed portions of the platform it rested upon were protected by 12.7 millimetres of armor. The armored pilothouse was positioned ahead of the turret.

Service
Ceará was laid down at the Arsenal de Marinha da Côrte in Rio de Janeiro on 8 December 1866, during the Paraguayan War, which saw Argentina and Brazil allied against Paraguay. She was launched on 22 March 1868 and commissioned the following month. The monitor arrived in Paraguay in May 1868. On 31 August she bombarded enemy positions on the Tebicuary River to provide cover for advancing troops. The ship destroyed Paraguayan defenses on the Manduvirá River on 18 April 1869. After the war she was assigned to the Mato Grosso Flotilla and was scrapped in 1884.

Footnotes

References
 
 
 

Ships built in Brazil
1868 ships
Pará-class monitors